Yasmin Benoit (born 10 June 1996) is an English model, activist, and writer. She has promoted the visibility of asexuality, aromanticism, and of LGBTQ+ people of colour and has worked as a lingerie and alternative model. As Aislin Magazine wrote, in "the predominantly White alternative branch of modeling, [Benoit has] become one of the UK's most prominent Black alternative models."

Early life
Benoit is from Reading, Berkshire. She is of Trinidadian, Jamaican, and Barbadian descent. She attended Reading Girls' School and Padworth College. She has a Bachelor of Science in Sociology from St Mary's University, Twickenham and a Master of Science in Crime Science from University College London.

Although she did not have a word for it yet, Benoit knew she was not interested in anyone sexually or romantically from as early as 9 years old. She chose to attend an all-girls school because she believed the absence of boys would lessen the chance of sexual intercourse and relationships coming up in conversation. Instead, Benoit stated she "made a terrible mistake" as it seemed to increase the likelihood of it coming up, and her classmates accused her of being gay or a victim of child sexual abuse because she did not relate to their enthusiasm around the subject.

Benoit came across the term asexual in high school but did not fully claim it as part of her identity until after she had interacted with other asexual people online and started her career as an activist.

Career
Benoit began modeling at age 16, focusing her efforts on alternative fashion despite the industry's emphasis of Eurocentric beauty standards. Her first modeling breakthrough was in 2015 with Scottish brand CRMC. Her gigs following that included Love Sick London, Dethkult Clothing, Seduced By Lilith, Kuki London, Pin Up Girl Clothing, and Teen Hearts.
In March 2018, Benoit collaborated with African-American-owned gothic fashion brand, Gothic Lamb.

Benoit appeared in a BBC Three documentary on asexuality, but was critical of the experience, claiming the way the documentary framed asexuality was a misrepresentation. She later appeared in a Sky News documentary on asexuality in February 2019. Regarding her work as a lingerie model whilst being asexual, she told Sky News, "I'm literally here to show off the clothes and make it look good. I'm not trying to sell myself, I'm trying to sell a product."

Benoit has written for several publications including HuffPost UK and given talks at several events and universities, including the University of Cambridge, the UK Asexuality Conference in 2018, Reading Pride, King's College London in February 2019, and National Student Pride.

In January 2019, Benoit wrote an article for Qwear Fashion magazine in which she created the hashtag #ThisIsWhatAsexualLooksLike. Benoit noted in her interview with Ireland's Sunday Independent that the hashtag was in response to people telling her she did not "look" asexual after coming out. She encourages other people on the asexual spectrum to use her hashtag to show the diversity of the asexual community that is otherwise underrepresented in the media. An Instagram account, ThisIsWhatAsexualLooksLike, was created to share submissions under the hashtag and is followed by Benoit.

In collaboration with Asexual Visibility and Education Network (AVEN), Budweiser, and Revolt London, Benoit hosted the first asexual-themed bar at Pride in London in 2019. Benoit walked the runway in the London Queer Fashion Show that year. In October, she joined the board of directors of the AVEN. In a December 2019 issue of Attitude titled "The Activists", Benoit became the first openly asexual woman to appear on the cover of a UK magazine.

Throughout early 2020, Benoit worked with England Unwrapped where she interviewed asexual people about their experience with asexuality in their daily lives. The episode was originally broadcast on BBC Radio Berkshire and later published on BBC Sounds.

Alongside AVEN and other activists, Benoit announced in February 2021 that she was part of the launching of International Asexuality Day which occurred for the first time on April 6, 2021.

In June 2021, Yasmin became the first asexual activist to win an Attitude Pride Award from Attitude Magazine.

On the second annual International Asexuality Day, it was announced that Benoit is launching the UK's first asexual rights initiative in partnership with  Stonewall; known as the Stonewall x Yasmin Benoit Ace Project.

Personal life
Benoit is asexual and aromantic. "I may not be the first four letters, but I do not relate to the heterosexual experience in the slightest," she told The Nopebook in March 2019. She came out publicly in a video on YouTube in 2017 titled "Things Asexual Girls Don't Like to Hear", which began her journey as an activist.

Benoit has opened up about her experiences as an asexual lingerie model. She also works to dispel myths and stereotypes regarding asexuality and aromanticism, whilst promoting the diversity of the asexual and aromantic communities and visibility for the voices within them.

References

External links
 

Living people
1996 births
People educated at Padworth College
Alumni of St Mary's University, Twickenham
Alumni of University College London
Aromantic women
Asexual women
Black British fashion people
Black British women
English female models
English people of Barbadian descent
English people of Jamaican descent
English people of Trinidad and Tobago descent
English women activists
English LGBT rights activists
People from Reading, Berkshire
LGBT models
English LGBT people
British LGBT writers
Women civil rights activists
LGBT Black British people